Noah Elliott (born July 12, 1997) is a Paralympic snowboarder who competed for the United States at the 2018 Winter Paralympics held in Pyeongchang, South Korea. He won gold in Snowboarding at the 2018 Winter Paralympics – Men's banked slalom division SB-LL1.

He won the gold medal in the men's dual banked slalom SB-LL1 event at the 2021 World Para Snow Sports Championships held in Lillehammer, Norway.

His daughter’s name is Skylar.

References

External links 
 
 
 Noah Elliott at World Para Snowboard

1997 births
Living people
American male snowboarders
Paralympic snowboarders of the United States
Paralympic medalists in snowboarding
Paralympic gold medalists for the United States
Paralympic bronze medalists for the United States
Snowboarders at the 2018 Winter Paralympics
Snowboarders at the 2022 Winter Paralympics
Medalists at the 2018 Winter Paralympics
21st-century American people